Matt Bliss is an American politician serving in the Minnesota House of Representatives since 2021, who also served from 2017 to 2019. A member of the Republican Party of Minnesota, Bliss represents District 2A in northern Minnesota, which includes parts of Becker, Beltrami, Cass, Clearwater, Hubbard, Itasca, and Mahnomen Counties.

Early life, education, and career
Bliss was raised on a farm and is one of ten siblings. He joined the Navy after high school and was trained in communications and electronics. 

Bliss owns Bliss Point Resort along Cass Lake and worked as an IT director for the Red Lake Nation. He was the president of the Pennington Resort Association. 

Bliss ran unsuccessfully for the Beltrami County Board of Commissioners in 2014.

Minnesota House of Representatives
Bliss was elected to the Minnesota House of Representatives in 2016. He defeated four-term DFL incumbent John Persell. In 2018, Bliss lost to Persell by 11 votes. In 2020, he once again defeated Pursell, and was reelected in 2022.

Bliss serves as the minority lead on the Veteran and Military Affairs Committee and also sits on the Children and Families Finance and Policy and the Elections Finance and Policy Committees.

Electoral history

Personal life
Bliss lives in Pennington, Minnesota with his wife Emily, and has four children. He was previously married to Christine until she died of cancer. He is a member of the Minnesota Deer Hunters’ Association, Pheasants Forever, Ducks Unlimited, and the Ruffed Grouse Society.

References

External links

 Official House of Representatives website
 Official campaign website

Living people
Republican Party members of the Minnesota House of Representatives
21st-century American politicians
Year of birth missing (living people)